Roseberry Robinson Briggs (1925–2013), sometimes spelled Rosebery, was a Nigerian politician of the National Party of Nigeria. He was the first Speaker of the Rivers State House of Assembly, serving two consecutive terms from 1979 to 1987. He died in 2013, at the age of 88.

See also
List of people from Rivers State

References

External links
Rivers State House of Assembly 

2013 deaths
Rivers State politicians
Speakers of the Rivers State House of Assembly
1925 births